John Forsyth Crawford (26 September 1896 – 27 September 1975) was an English footballer who played as an winger throughout his career.

Playing career 
Born in Jarrow, Crawford started his professional career with Hull City, before signing for Chelsea for £3,000 in May 1923. He quickly became a regular in the side for the next five years, and after several near-misses, eventually helped them gain promotion back to the First Division in 1929-30. Thereafter, the ageing Crawford was overshadowed by new star signings like Hughie Gallacher and Alex Jackson, and joined Queens Park Rangers in 1934. He made 308 appearances for Chelsea, scoring 27 goals.

International career
Crawford was capped once for England, playing the full 90 minutes in a 2–0 loss to Scotland at Hampden Park on 28 March 1931.

References

1896 births
1975 deaths
Chelsea F.C. players
England international footballers
English footballers
Hull City A.F.C. players
Sportspeople from Jarrow
Footballers from Tyne and Wear
Queens Park Rangers F.C. players
Association football midfielders
20th-century Royal Navy personnel